Josep Corominas i Busqueta (24 March 1939 – 30 December 2020) was a Spanish Catalan doctor and politician who served as a Deputy between 1989 and 2000 and Grand Master of the Spain's Grand Lodge between 2002 and 2006.

References

1939 births
2020 deaths
Members of the 4th Congress of Deputies (Spain)
Members of the 5th Congress of Deputies (Spain)
Members of the 6th Congress of Deputies (Spain)
Spanish Freemasons